"Occidentali's Karma" is a song performed by Italian singer Francesco Gabbani. The song was released as a digital download on 10 February 2017 through BMG Rights Management as the lead single from his third studio album Magellano (2017). The song was written by Gabbani, Filippo Gabbani, Fabio Ilacqua, and Luca Chiaravalli. It won the Sanremo Music Festival 2017 and represented Italy in the Eurovision Song Contest 2017, finishing in sixth place.

Lyrics
The main theme of the song is the superficial lifestyle of westerners, mainly based on materialism and appearance. The lyrics refer to the internet as the opiate of the poor (in reference to Marx), 'selfie addiction', internet know-it-alls, and a society based on conformity and uniformity. As a result, our evolution seems to 'stumble' instead of moving forward.

According to Gabbani, the chorus of the song is a mockery of westerners who believe they can take Eastern cultures and "westernise" them. The song cites such aspects of Indian religions as the Buddha and Nirvana as well as man's evolution from the ape, an idea which he got from reading The Naked Ape, written by British ethologist Desmond Morris. In an interview with La Repubblica, Desmond Morris praised the song for the "clear and fanciful reference to the theories" described by him, 
and for "the precision and sophistication of the lyrics" like Bob Dylan and John Lennon. Morris also added that he wanted Francesco Gabbani to win the Eurovision Song Contest.

The song begins with a reference to William Shakespeare's Hamlet. Gabbani wants to highlight how modern society is divided between spirituality and appearances, describing people as "selfie-addicted".

The use of the Saxon genitive in the song title and chorus is a further critique of the tendency toward anglicisation of the Italian language, with the song originally titled in Latin as "Occidentalis Karma"  (Western Karma).

Sanremo Music Festival 2017

On 11 December 2016, Gabbani was confirmed to be one of the artists who would be competing in the campioni ("champions") section of the Sanremo Music Festival 2017.

Gabbani performed the song for the first time on 8 February 2017, during the second night of the contest. During his performance, choreographer Filippo Ranaldi appeared on stage and danced with Gabbani while dressed in a gorilla costume, which reprised the idea of the Naked Ape, also cited in the song's lyrics.

On 11 February 2017, having advanced to the final, Gabbani defeated Fiorella Mannoia and Ermal Meta, winning not only the competition, but also the right to represent Italy at Eurovision 2017.

Eurovision Song Contest

Following his win, it was confirmed by RAI and the European Broadcasting Union that Gabbani had accepted the invitation to represent Italy in the Eurovision Song Contest, which is given to the winner of the Sanremo Music Festival, and that he'd be performing "Occidentali's Karma" at Eurovision. As Italy is a member of the "Big Five", he automatically advanced to the final, held on 13 May 2017 in Kyiv, Ukraine. On May 13, the song finished sixth at the Eurovision 2017 final, and won the Marcel Bezençon Press Award given to the best entry as voted on by the accredited media and press during the event.

The song is the first in Eurovision history to feature words in Sanskrit, while being the second entry to have words in Ancient Greek (the first being "Pia Prosefhi" by Elina Konstantopoulou representing Greece in the 1995 edition.)

During an interview, Luca Chiaravalli, author and producer of the song, said that the lyrics would probably be changed before the Eurovision live performance. According to the Eurovision rules, in fact, the song cannot last more than three minutes. Therefore, the track must be shortened. A sentence containing the word "Chanel" was one of the things which were removed, as it is a registered trademark. During the TV program Standing Ovation (broadcast on Rai 1) Francesco Gabbani declared that the song would remain with the lyrics in Italian. On 17 March 2017, the official Eurovision version of the song was published.

Music video
The accompanying music video for the song was directed by Gabriele Lucchetti. On 12 February 2017, the video for "Occidentali's Karma" was viewed 4,353,802 times on Vevo, setting a new record for the number of single-day views on the platform by an Italian music video. The video reached 100 million views in YouTube on 24 April 2017, becoming the first ever song from the Eurovision Song Contest to do so.

Commercial performance
The song debuted at number-one on the Italian FIMI Top Digital chart, and it was certified gold during its first week, becoming the fastest-selling single in Italy, with 47,175 equivalent units in its first week, and receiving 2,472,000 weekly streams, the highest number ever reached by any single in the chart's history.

Track listing

Charts

Weekly charts

Year-end charts

Certifications

Release history

References

2016 songs
2017 singles
Italian-language songs
Francesco Gabbani songs
Sanremo Music Festival songs
Eurovision songs of Italy
Eurovision songs of 2017
Songs written by Francesco Gabbani
Number-one singles in Italy